Iroquois-class homeodomain protein IRX-4, also known as Iroquois homeobox protein 4, is a protein that in humans is encoded by the IRX4 gene.

Function 

IRX4 is a member of the Iroquois homeobox gene family. Members of this family appear to play multiple roles during pattern formation of vertebrate embryos.

References

Further reading